Psiloptera olivieri is a species of beetle of the Buprestidae family identified only in Brazil.

References 

Insects of Brazil
Buprestidae